Phey is a village in the Leh district of Ladakh, India. It is located in the Leh tehsil.

Demographics 
According to the 2011 census of India, Phey has 57 households. The effective literacy rate (i.e. the literacy rate of population excluding children aged 6 and below) is 83.16%.

References

Villages in Leh tehsil